The zeze is a stringed instrument, a stick zither from Sub-Saharan Africa. It is also known by the names tzetze and dzendze, and, in Madagascar, is called jejy voatavo. It has one or two strings, made of steel or bicycle brake wire.

Names

In mainland Africa, the instrument is usually known by the names zeze, tzetze or dzendze. On Madagascar it is known by the name Jejy voatavo. On the Comoros Islands, it is known by the name dzendzé ya shitsuva.

In popular culture

Also referenced in Kodak Black's song “ZeZe”, with samples of the instrument in the beat.

References

General references
 The Stringed Instrument Database
 ATLAS of Plucked Instruments
 Thesis paper on the Zeze. PDF file

African musical instruments
Stick zithers